Elizabeth Lee McGovern (born July 18, 1961) is an American actress and musician. She has received many awards, including a Screen Actors Guild Award, three Golden Globe Award nominations, and one Academy Award nomination.

Born in Evanston, Illinois, McGovern spent most of her early life in Los Angeles. After attending the American Conservatory Theater and the Juilliard School, she made her feature film debut in Ordinary People (1980). For her role as Evelyn Nesbit in the musical film Ragtime (1981), she received a nomination for the Academy Award for Best Supporting Actress. She subsequently had lead roles in a number of major studio films, including Once Upon a Time in America (1984), She's Having a Baby (1987), The Bedroom Window (1987), The Handmaid's Tale (1990), and The Wings of the Dove (1997).

In 2007, McGovern, after years of studying guitar, formed the musical group Sadie and the Hotheads, with whom she has released four studio albums since 2016. She gained further international attention for her portrayal of Cora, Countess of Grantham, in the British drama series Downton Abbey (2010–2015), for which she was nominated for an Emmy Award and Golden Globe Award. She reprised her role as Cora in the subsequent films Downton Abbey (2019) and Downton Abbey: A New Era (2022).

Early life
McGovern was born in Evanston, Illinois, the daughter of Katharine Wolcott (née Watts), a high school teacher, and William Montgomery McGovern, Jr., a university professor. She is of Irish, English, and Scottish descent. Her younger sister is novelist Cammie McGovern. Her paternal grandfather was adventurer William Montgomery McGovern, her maternal great-grandfathers were U.S. diplomat Ethelbert Watts and Admiral Charles P. Snyder, and her maternal great-great-grandfather was Congressman Charles P. Snyder.

When McGovern was 10 years old, she relocated with her family from Illinois to Los Angeles, California, where her father accepted a teaching position at UCLA School of Law. She attended North Hollywood High School, where she began performing in school plays. After high school, she attended the American Conservatory Theater in San Francisco, and studied toward a Bachelor of Fine Arts in Drama at the Juilliard School in New York City as a member of Group 12 from 1979 to 1981.

Career
In 1980, while studying at Juilliard, McGovern was offered a part in what became her first film, Ordinary People, in which she played the girlfriend of troubled teenager Conrad Jarrett (Timothy Hutton). The following year she completed her acting education at the American Conservatory Theater and Juilliard, and began to appear in plays, first Off-Broadway and later in famous theaters.

In 1981 she earned an Academy Award nomination for Best Supporting Actress for her role as Evelyn Nesbit in the film Ragtime. She then appeared in Beginners (1982).

In 1984, she starred in Sergio Leone's gangster epic Once Upon a Time in America as Robert De Niro's romantic interest Deborah Gelly. She had leading roles in two other films that year, Racing with the Moon, a coming-of-age story also starring Sean Penn and Nicolas Cage, and the comedy Lovesick, as a patient whose psychiatrist (Dudley Moore) falls in love with her, risking his practice.

In 1989, she played Mickey Rourke's girlfriend in Johnny Handsome, directed by Walter Hill, and the same year she appeared as a rebellious lesbian in Volker Schlöndorff's film The Handmaid's Tale.

McGovern co-starred with Kevin Bacon in a romantic comedy, She's Having a Baby, directed by John Hughes, and starred in the thriller The Bedroom Window, directed by Curtis Hanson. She teamed with Michael Caine in 1990's A Shock to the System, a comic mystery about a man who plots the murder of his wife.

In a 1994 comedy, The Favor, McGovern played a woman who cheats on her boyfriend (played by Brad Pitt) by becoming her married best friend's proxy in a tryst with a man the friend has fantasized about.

McGovern appeared in a number of films in the 21st century, including Woman in Gold, a drama starring Helen Mirren and directed by her husband Simon Curtis.

In 2018, McGovern starred in The Chaperone, directed by Michael Engler and written by Julian Fellowes, whom she also worked with on the British drama series Downton Abbey. Based on the novel by Laura Moriarty, McGovern played Norma Carlisle, a middle-aged wife and mother who volunteers to chaperone the young Louise Brooks to New York City to study dance at the Denishawn School. The Chaperone is the first film that McGovern has also produced. Her husband, Simon Curtis, was an executive producer for the film.

McGovern reprised her role as Cora Crawley, Countess of Grantham for the Downton Abbey film in 2019 and its 2022 sequel. The films continue the storyline of the TV series.

Television
McGovern has appeared in several television productions, mostly in the UK. In 1999 and 2000 McGovern played Marguerite St. Just in a BBC television series loosely based on the novel The Scarlet Pimpernel. She also starred in the four-part television crime drama series Thursday the 12th that same year.

On American TV, she appeared in a 2006 episode of Law & Order: Special Victims Unit titled "Harm", in which her character of Dr. Faith Sutton was a psychiatrist accused of complicity in detainee abuse. Her other television work includes Broken Glass (Arthur Miller, 1996); Tales from the Crypt; The Changeling; Tales from Hollywood; the HBO series Men and Women; The Man in the Brooks Brothers Shirt; Shelley Duvall's Faerie Tale Theatre ("Snow White and the Seven Dwarfs"); and If Not for You (CBS 1995, own series).

In May 2007, she played Ellen Doubleday, Daphne du Maurier's paramour, in Daphne, a BBC2 television drama by Amy Jenkins based on Margaret Forster's biography of the author.

In December 2008, McGovern appeared as Dame Celia Westholme in "Appointment with Death", an episode of Agatha Christie's Poirot. In the same year, she appeared in the three-part BBC comedy series Freezing, written by James Wood and directed and co-produced by her husband Simon Curtis. First broadcast on BBC Four, it was also shown on BBC2 in February 2008. McGovern played an American expatriate actress named Elizabeth, living in Chiswick with her publisher husband, played by Hugh Bonneville, and co-starring Tom Hollander as her theatrical agent.

From 2010 to 2015, she portrayed Cora Crawley, Countess of Grantham, wife of Robert Crawley, 7th Earl of Grantham (played by Hugh Bonneville) in the British TV series Downton Abbey, and also in the 2019 and 2022 film adaptations. Downton Abbey was the third time McGovern and Bonneville have been cast as a married couple on screen, having previously co-starred in Freezing and Thursday the 12th together.

Music
McGovern is also a singer-songwriter and plays the guitar. In 2008 she began fronting the band Sadie and the Hotheads at The Castle pub venue in Portobello Road, London. The band released an album of songs she developed with The Nelson Brothers, who are now part of the band. The album, I Can Wait, also includes Ron Knights on bass and Rowan Oliver, borrowed from Goldfrapp, as drummer for the recording sessions. Michelle Dockery, who plays McGovern's eldest daughter in Downton Abbey, has occasionally sung with the band. Dockery was also a guest backing vocalist on the bands second album How Not To Lose Things, released in 2012. Terl Bryant also joined the band, taking over from Rowan Oliver as drummer and percussionist.

Throughout 2013, Sadie and the Hotheads toured the UK and Europe and performed in festivals including the Isle of Wight Festival, Montreux Jazz Festival and Edinburgh Festival Fringe. At the end of the year they announced that they were working on their third album with support from former direct-to-fan crowdfunding company PledgeMusic. Still Waiting was released in early 2014 prior to their next UK tour as the support act for Mike and the Mechanics.

McGovern recorded three Christmas tracks in 2014. Her rendition of It Came Upon a Midnight Clear and duet with Julian Ovenden performing The First Noel appear on the double-disc album Christmas At Downton Abbey, produced by Warner Music. Sadie and the Hotheads also released their cover version of the Christmas song The Little Drummer Boy.

Following the conclusion of TV series Downton Abbey in late 2015, McGovern and her band Sadie and the Hotheads began work on a fourth album and embarked on a mini tour of the UK. While they continued to record their new album, the band released a compilation album of songs from their first three albums entitled The Collection (Everybody's Got A Song) in early 2016.

In 2017, McGovern and "Hothead" Simon Nelson collaborated with American singer and musician Duke Robillard on a track for his album Duke Robillard & His Dames of Rhythm. McGovern sings vocals for "Me, Myself and I" while Nelson is a guest musician on electric guitar for the track.

McGovern's fifth album, The Truth, was released in early 2019. Unlike her previous albums with her band, The Truth was released under her name, though it features all of the musicians from Sadie and the Hotheads. The album includes a track on which Samuel L. Jackson appears as a guest vocalist.

Theatre

Roles in New York include:
Melissa Gardner in Love Letters (A R Gurney) at the Edison Theatre, October 1989
Ophelia in Hamlet with the Roundabout Theater Company at the Criterion Center Stage Right, April 1992.
Mrs. Conway in Time and the Conways at the American Airlines Theatre, October 2017

In her theatre programme CVs (below), McGovern lists her other theatre work in the U.S. as including:
My Sister in This House (Wendy Kesselman)
Painting Churches (Tina Howe)
The Hitch-Hiker
Viola in Twelfth Night
A Map of the World (David Hare)
Aunt Dan and Lemon (Wallace Shawn)
A Midsummer Night's Dream at the New York Shakespeare Festival, Winter 1987
When I Was a Girl I Used to Scream and Shout (Sharman Macdonald)
Maids of Honour
Three Sisters (Chekhov)
As You Like It

Since moving to London, McGovern's stage work has included:
Jenny in The Misanthrope (Molière freely adapted by Martin Crimp) at the Young Vic Theatre, February 1996
Darlene in Hurlyburly (David Rabe) at the Old Vic Theatre, March 1997
Nan and Lina in Three Days of Rain (Richard Greenberg) at the Donmar Warehouse, March and November 1999
Beth in Dinner With Friends (Donald Margulies) at the Hampstead Theatre, June 2001
Hester Prynne in The Scarlet Letter (Nathaniel Hawthorne adapted by Phyllis Nagy) at the Minerva Theatre, August 2005
Jackie Kennedy in Aristo at the Minerva Theatre, September – October 2008
Judith Brown in Complicit by Joe Sutton in The Old Vic, January 2009
Miss A in The Shawl by David Mamet in the Arcola Theatre, September 2009
June in Sunset at the Villa Thalia by Alexi Kaye Campbell at the Royal National Theatre, May - August 2016 
Veronica in God of Carnage by Yasmina Reza at the Theatre Royal, Bath, August – September 2018
Anne in The Starry Messenger by Kenneth Lonergan at Wyndham's Theatre, May - August 2019 
Veronica in God of Carnage by Yasmina Reza, on tour in the UK, January - February 2020 
Ava Gardner in Ava: The Secret Conversations at Riverside Studios in Hammersmith, London, January - April 2022. 

McGovern was awarded the 2013 Will Award by the Shakespeare Theatre Company.

In early 2020, McGovern was in rehearsal to star in a revival of The Little Foxes by American playwright Lillian Hellman at the Gate Theatre in Dublin. However, due to the Impact of the COVID-19 pandemic on the performing arts, the show has been postponed indefinitely.

Personal life
In 1992, McGovern married British film director and producer Simon Curtis; the couple have two daughters and live in Chiswick, London.

Filmography

Film

Television

Discography

Sadie and the Hotheads

Solo

Album guest appearances

References
Theatre Record and its annual Indexes

External links

1961 births
Actresses from Evanston, Illinois
Actresses from Los Angeles
American Conservatory Theater alumni
American expatriates in England
American film actresses
American stage actresses
American television actresses
American women singer-songwriters
American people of English descent
American people of Irish descent
American people of Scottish descent
American women guitarists
Audiobook narrators
Juilliard School alumni
Living people
20th-century American actresses
21st-century American actresses
Musicians from Evanston, Illinois
Musicians from Los Angeles
North Hollywood High School alumni
Singer-songwriters from California
Singer-songwriters from Illinois